Chalice International is an international humanitarian aid organization. Chalice provides aid focusing on child and community development in developing countries such as Zambia, Guatemala, the Philippines, Ukraine, and Bangladesh, under local direction.

Chalice provides housing, medicine, education, and nutrition to populations in need such as impoverished children, the elderly, the homeless, and the sick. They also assist with the construction, repair, and expansion of hospitals, schools, and orphanages.

History 
Chalice was founded in Canada in 1996 by Fr. Patrick Cosgrove as Christian Child Care International, changing to Chalice in January 2008. Chalice expanded to the United States in July 2017.

Early on, the organization used sponsorship money to buy necessities for sponsored children. However, when Cosgrove visited Congregation of Notre Dame Sr. Marilyn von Zuben in Haiti, he learnt that she had brought mothers for regular meetings to discuss their needs and plans with the money. She convinced Cosgrove that it was more effective to trust the parents with the funds for their children.

Chalice Canada is headquartered in Nova Scotia, Canada, while Chalice USA is headquartered in Chicago, Illinois.

Chalice was featured by the CBC when Jerry West, a producer, traveled to Bolivia and Peru.

Programs 
Chalice's programs include:

 Sponsorship of children and elderly
 Nutrition Program
 Capital Projects and Human Development Programs
 Disaster and Critical Needs Response

The aim of all programs is to create more self-sustaining families and more educated children.

Chalice uses direct family funding to dispense funds from sponsorship. Each guardian joins a community group, opens a bank account, and receives financial literacy training to manage their child's funds, prioritizing education fees. Members of the group contribute a small amount to a pool which is distributed as educated loans or projects which generate income.

Chalice Canada, working in Haiti since 2000, was active on the ground to rebuild communities after the 7.2 earthquake in 2021 struck the Tiburon Peninsula.

Programs are monitored through tools, databases, and qualitative and quantitative data collected by local staff concerning child education, family preparedness, and community assets. During the COVID-19 pandemic, online classrooms were launched in multiple languages to identify and address community needs. Over 50,000 children and elderly people have been sponsored through Chalice.

Awards 

 MoneySense Canada's Top Rated Charities 2017 - #5 International Aid & Development
 MoneySense Top Charities in Canada 2018 - #4 International Aid
 The Globe and Mail 2018 Top 100 Nonprofit Organizations
 Maclean's Canada's Best Charities 2020: #5 
 MoneySense Canada’s top-rated charities 2020
 Charity Intelligence 2021 Top Rated Charities: #3 International Aid

References  

Humanitarian aid organizations
Catholic charities